Ireland–Turkey relations are the bilateral relations between Ireland and Turkey. Formal relations were established in 1972. Ireland's embassy in Ankara was opened in 1998. Turkey has had an embassy in Dublin since 1973. Both countries are full members of the Council of Europe, the Organisation for Economic Co-operation and Development (OECD), the Organization for Security and Co-operation in Europe (OSCE), the Union for the Mediterranean and the World Trade Organization (WTO). Furthermore, Ireland is a member of the European Union while Turkey is a candidate.

History

During the Great Famine in Ireland of the 1840s, Ottoman Sultan Abdülmecid (pronounced Abdul Majid) donated £1,000 to famine relief (equivalent to between US$84,000 and US$216,000 in 2019). A letter written by Irish notables in the Ottoman archives explicitly thanks the Sultan for his help.

According to legend, the Sultan had originally intended to send £10,000, but either British diplomats or his own ministers requested that the Sultan send only £1,000, so as not to violate protocol by donating more than Queen Victoria, who had sent £2,000. He is also said to have sent three or five ships full of food. Shipping records relating to the port appear not to have survived. Newspaper reports suggest that ships from Thessaloniki (Selanik) in the Ottoman Empire sailed up the River Boyne in May 1847, although it has also been claimed that the river was dry at the time. In 1995, the Drogheda town hall erected a placard in commemoration. In 2012, plans were announced to produce a film on the subject, starring Colin Farrell and several Turkish stars.

The claim that he had wanted to give £10,000 first appears in Taylor & Mackay's Life and Times of Sir Robert Peel (1851), but the book is not referenced and no source is given. A second source, dating to 1894, is more explicit: the Irish nationalist William J. O'Neill Daunt claimed to have heard from the son of the sultan's personal physician that he "had intended to give £10,000 to the famine-stricken Irish, but was deterred by the English ambassador, Lord Cowley, as Her Majesty, who had only subscribed £1000, would have been annoyed had a foreign sovereign given a larger sum…"

After 2018, with the initiatives of Erdal Eren BAYRAK, the Turkish Association Agreement, also known as Ankara Agreement (1963), paved the way for individual applications and the Turkish population in Ireland increased rapidly in a short time.

Economic relations

In 2011, bilateral trade volume reached 1,19 billion USD with an Irish surplus of US$485 million. By the end of March 2012, 289 companies with Irish capital were active in Turkey. Ireland's direct investment in Turkey reached US$337 million in 2011.

Turkish Airlines currently operate two daily flights between Dublin and Istanbul, with seasonal flights to Antalya. Aer Lingus, Ryanair and SunExpress also operate seasonal flights to some Mediterranean Turkish cities.

See also 
 Foreign relations of Ireland
 Foreign relations of Turkey
 Turks in Ireland
 Turks in Europe
 Town arms of Drogheda

References

External links 
 Embassy of Turkey in Ireland
 Embassy of Ireland in Turkey
 Turkish Ministry of Foreign Affairs about relations with Ireland

 
Turkey
Bilateral relations of Turkey